Alekano, or Gahuku (Gahuku-Gama), is a Papuan language spoken in Gahuku Rural LLG of Eastern Highlands Province, Papua New Guinea. There are about 25,000 speakers.

Alekano is also known as Gahuku, after the name of the largest clan of speakers, or Gama, after the second largest clan. Calling the language by these names has been rejected by speakers who are not members of these clans, and Alekano has been largely adopted as the official name. The latter name means "bring it". In two closely related languages spoken directly to the northwest, Tokano and Dano, it has the same meaning.

Phonology
Alekano has 5 vowels, all unrounded, which is exceptional. It has 12 consonants, but  is found only in the village Wanima, in derivations or in pidgin loanwords.

Vowels

Glottal coda
In Alekano, a syllable may be closed only with a glottal stop, as in  "enough". That is currently not treated as a consonant, but it is unclear if words written as vowel initial begin with a glottal stop. It is written as an acute accent in the orthography, for example, ánesí.

Consonants

Syllables
Other vowels may also occur in sequence (hiatus).

Tone
Alekano has low and high tones but with a very low functional load. HL receives strong stress, LH lesser stress.

Grammar
Alekano is a subject–object–verb (SOV) language.

Orthography
Alekano uses the Latin script.

References

External links
Alekano dictionary 
An open access archive of Alekano audio and video are available through the Kaipuleohone.

Kainantu–Goroka languages
Languages of Eastern Highlands Province
Subject–object–verb languages
Tonal languages